Millecoquins River may refer to a river in Michigan in the United States:

Lower Millecoquins River
Upper Millecoquins River